Les Mureaux is a commune in the Yvelines department in the Île-de-France region in north-central France. It is located in the north-western suburbs of Paris,  from the centre of Paris.

Population

Transport
Les Mureaux is served by Les Mureaux station on the Transilien Paris-Saint-Lazare suburban rail line.

Education
There are eleven preschools, eleven elementary schools, three junior high schools, and two senior high schools/sixth form colleges in Les Mureaux.

Junior high schools:
 Collège Paul-Verlaine
 Collège Jules-Verne
 Collège Jean-Vilar

Senior high schools/sixth form colleges:
 Lycée professionnel et technologique Jacques-Vaucanson
 Lycée général et technologique François-Villon

International relations

Les Mureaux is twinned with:
 Idar-Oberstein, Germany
 Margate, United Kingdom
 Nonantola, Italy
 Sosnowiec, Poland

See also
Communes of the Yvelines department

References

External links

 Official website 

Communes of Yvelines